The 2019 Segundona is the 25th season of the second-tier football league in Angola.

The league comprises 8 teams to play in a (home & away) double round robin system, the three first ranking of which being automatically promoted to the 2019–20 Girabola.

Stadia and locations

Match details
All teams play in a double round robin system (home and away).

Table & results

See also
2018–19 Girabola

References

External links
Federação Angolana de Futebol

Segundona
Segundona
Angola